Jérôme van der Zijl (born 24 August 1988 in Brussels) is a Belgian footballer who plays as a defender. His club teams include Lierse S.K., RAEC Mons, KSC Grimbergen, and A.F.C. Tubize.
He married tennis player Yanina Wickmayer in 2017.

References

1988 births
Living people
Belgian footballers
Belgian Pro League players
Association football defenders
Footballers from Brussels
R.A.E.C. Mons players
A.F.C. Tubize players